Anayansi Pérez Aragón (born 14 September 1976) is a Cuban windsurfer. She competed in the 2000 Summer Olympics.

Notes

References

External links
 
 
 

1976 births
Living people
Cuban female sailors (sport)
Cuban windsurfers
Female windsurfers
Olympic sailors of Cuba
Sailors at the 2000 Summer Olympics – Mistral One Design